Alexander Leonard Gray (12 May 1891 – 26 July 1945) was an Australian rules footballer who played with Melbourne in the Victorian Football League (VFL).

Gray, a full-back, came to the Melbourne Football Club from Leopold. He made 16 appearances in his debut VFL season and seven more, including a Semi Final, before the war interrupted his career after 1915. Gray resumed at Melbourne in 1919 but the club had a poor year and he experienced a loss in each of his 13 games.

References

1891 births
1945 deaths
Melbourne Football Club players
Australian rules footballers from Victoria (Australia)